Miguel Navarro (22 November 1929 – 20 March 2022) was a Spanish long-distance runner. He competed in the marathon at the 1960 Summer Olympics.

References

External links
 

1929 births
2022 deaths
Athletes (track and field) at the 1960 Summer Olympics
Spanish male long-distance runners
Spanish male marathon runners
Olympic athletes of Spain
Athletes from Barcelona
Mediterranean Games silver medalists for Spain
Mediterranean Games medalists in athletics
Athletes (track and field) at the 1959 Mediterranean Games
20th-century Spanish people